The Gherceşti gas field is a natural gas field located in Ghercești, Dolj County. It was discovered in 1970 and developed by Romgaz. It began production in 1975 and produces natural gas and condensates. The total proven reserves of the Gherceşti gas field are around 400 billion cubic feet (11 km³), and production is centered on 100 million cubic feet/day (2.8×105m³). Romgaz also operates a large gas storage facility at this site.

References

Natural gas fields in Romania